The 1949 UC Santa Barbara Gauchos football team represented Santa Barbara College during the 1949 college football season.

Santa Barbara competed in the California Collegiate Athletic Association (CCAA). The team was led by first-year head coach Roy Engle and played home games at La Playa Stadium in Santa Barbara, California. They finished the season with a record of two wins and seven losses (2–7, 1–3 CCAA).

Schedule

Team players in the NFL
No Santa Barbara Gaucho players were selected in the 1950 NFL Draft.

The following finished their Santa Barbara Gauchos career in 1949, were not drafted, but played in the NFL.

Notes

References

Santa Barbara
UC Santa Barbara Gauchos football seasons
Santa Barbara Gauchos football